Yezdunya is a rural locality (a village) in Korobitsynskoye Rural Settlement, Syamzhensky District, Vologda Oblast, Russia. The population was 13 as of 2002.

Geography 
Yezdunya is located 49 km southeast of Syamzha (the district's administrative centre) by road. Sidorovo is the nearest rural locality.

References 

Rural localities in Syamzhensky District